Citizen Kihn is a 1985 studio album by Greg Kihn and the first since 1978's Next of Kihn not to be released under the Greg Kihn Band name. It was Kihn's first album after the dissolution of Beserkley Records and released by EMI America. The album reached number 51 on the Billboard Hot 200.

Track listing

Personnel
Greg Kihn – guitar, percussion, bellophone, lead vocals
Greg Douglass – guitar
Tyler Eng – drums
Steve Wright – bass, keyboards, lead guitar on "Lucky" and "Good Life", backing vocals
Additional personnel
Pat Mosca – keyboards on "They Rock By Night"
John Talbott – backing vocals, cabasa, talking drum
Steve Douglas – saxophone
Andy Narell – steel drums
Pete Escovedo – timbales, percussion

Production
Producer: Matthew King Kaufman
Engineers: Richard "Dr. Schnoz" Corsello, Tom Size
Mastering: George Horn
Alberto Dell'Orto - cover photography

References

External links
http://www.discogs.com/Greg-Kihn-Citizen-Kihn/release/1805095

1985 albums
Greg Kihn albums
EMI America Records albums